The following are statistics about Primera División de México, the top professional soccer league in Mexico, for the 1995–96 season.

Overview
It was contested by 18 teams, and Necaxa won the championship.

Celaya was promoted from Primera División 'A'.

UANL was relegated to  Primera División 'A'.

Teams

Group stage

Group 1

Group 2

Group 3

Group 4

Results

Playoff

Repechage

UANL won 4-5 on aggregate.

América won 0-2 on aggregate.

Playoff Series

Quarter-finals

Series tied 3-3 on aggregate. Veracruz advanced to semi-finals by away goals rule.

Series tied 2-2 on aggregate. Celaya advanced to semi-finals by away goals rule.

Necaxa won 2-1 on aggregate.

América won 3-2 on aggregate.

Semi-finals

Celaya won 6-1 on aggregate.

Necaxa won 3-1 on aggregate.

Final

1-1 on aggregate. Necaxa won on away goals.

Relegation table

References
Mexico - List of final tables (RSSSF)

Liga MX seasons
1995–96 in Mexican football
Mex